2019 in continental European music in geographical order.

Events
May 18 – The finale of the 64th Eurovision Song Contest takes place in Tel Aviv, Israel. It is won by Duncan Laurence, representing the Netherlands with the song "Arcade". It is the Netherlands' first win since 1975.

Scandinavia
Main article for Scandinavian music in 2019

Top hits
Danish #1s
Finnish #1 singles 2019, Finnish #1 albums
Norway charts
Swedish #1 singles and albums

Netherlands
Dutch #1 singles

Ireland
Main article for Irish music in 2019

UK
Main article for British music in 2019

Germany
15 February - Tobias Sammet's Avantasia releases Moonglow, featuring collaborations with artists such as Ronnie Atkins of Pretty Maids, Jørn Lande and Hansi Kürsch.

See also German number ones

Switzerland and Austria
Swiss #1s

France
French #1s

Italy
Italian number ones

Eastern Europe/ Balkans
List of Polish #1 singles
Czech #1 singles
Hungarian #1 singles

Musical films
En del av mitt hjärta (Sweden)

Deaths
1 January
Feis Ecktuh, 32, Dutch rapper (shot)
Joan Guinjoan, 87, Spanish composer and pianist
19 January – Mario Bertoncini, 86, Italian composer, pianist, and music educator
21 January – Marcel Azzola, 91, French accordionist
26 January – Michel Legrand, 86, French composer, conductor and jazz pianist, Oscar winner (1968, 1971, 1983).
17 February – Šaban Šaulić, 67, Serbian singer (traffic accident)
20 February
, 71, Dutch musician (Earth & Fire)
Ekkehard Wlaschiha, 80, German operatic baritone
21 February – Jean-Christophe Benoît, 93, French baritone
5 March – Jacques Loussier, 84, French jazz/classical pianist and composer
8 March – Michael Gielen, 91, Austrian conductor
12 March – Věra Bílá, 64, Czech singer (diabetes)
16 March
Yann-Fañch Kemener, 61, French singer
Yulia Nachalova, 38, Russian singer, actress and television presenter, cerebral edema.
1 April – Caravelli, 88, French conductor and composer
7 April – , 89, Italian jazz musician, musicologist and semiologist
12 April – Dina, 62, Portuguese singer (pulmonary fibrosis)
16 April – Jörg Demus, 90, Austrian pianist
24 April – Dick Rivers, 74, French rock and roll singer (Les Chats Sauvages)
21 May – Nilda Fernández, 61, Spanish-born French chanson singer (heart failure)
31 May – Đelo Jusić, 80, Croatian composer and guitarist
11 June – Enrico Nascimbeni, 59, Italian singer, journalist and poet (heart attack)
3 August – Henri Belolo, 82, French music producer (The Ritchie Family, Village People) and songwriter.
2 September – Laurent Sinclair, 58, French keyboardist and composer
23 October – Hansheinz Schneeberger, 93, Swiss violinist.
28 October
Zoltán Jeney, 76, Hungarian composer.
, 41, Czech singer and violinist, cancer.
31 October – Giannis Spanos, 85, Greek composer.
2 November
Leo Iorga, 54, Romanian rock singer and guitarist, cancer.
Marie Laforêt, 80, French-Swiss singer ("Mon amour, mon ami") and actress (Male Hunt, Who Wants to Kill Sara?).
8 November – Fred Bongusto, 84, Italian singer, songwriter and film composer
16 November – Éric Morena, 68, French singer
19 November 
José Mário Branco, 77, Portuguese singer-songwriter and record producer
Rémy Stricker, 83, French pianist and musicologist
11 December – Jiří Jirmal, 94, Czech classical guitarist
17 December – Jacques Grimbert, 90, French conductor
18 December – Alain Barrière, 84, French singer and Eurovision contestant

References

External links
 European Music Council 

European